Simon Vinkenoog (18 July 1928 – 12 July 2009) was a Dutch poet, spoken word poet and writer. He was the editor of the anthology Atonaal (Atonal), which launched the Dutch "Fifties Movement".

In 2004 he was chosen as Dichter des Vaderlands, or "Poet Laureate", for the Netherlands. On 11 July 2009 Vinkenoog was admitted to an Amsterdam hospital after suffering a seizure. He died the following day.

Bibliography
 1950 - Wondkoorts - poems
 1951 - Atonaal - anthology (editor) 
 1954 - Zo lang te water, een alibi - novel
 1962 - Hoogseizoen - novel
 1965 - Liefde - novel
 1968 - How to Enjoy Reality - pamphlet, included in International Times. With Jean-Paul Vroom
 1976 - Mij best - novel
 1978 - Het huiswerk van de dichter - poems
 1979 - (1972-1978) Bestaan en begaan
 1980 - Jack Kerouac in Amsterdam
 1980 - Moeder Gras
 1981 - Poolshoogte/Approximations
 1982 - Voeten in de aarde en bergen verzetten - poems
 1986 - Stadsnatuur, dagboeknotities
 1986 - Coito ergo Sum: samenspraak der eenwording
 1986 - O boze droom
 1987 - Leven en dood van Marcel Polak - biography
 1987 - Heren zeventien, proeve van waarneming
 1988 - Op het eerste gehoor - poems
 1993 - Louter genieten - poems
 1996 - Het hoogste woord: De stem van Simon Vinkenoog
 1998 - Vreugdevuur - poems
 1998 - Herem 'n tijd - collected articles
 2000 - De ware Adam - poems
 2001 - Me and my peepee  (translation of poems by Allen Ginsberg)

See also

 International Poetry Incarnation

References

External links

 Webstek Simon Vinkenoog
 NL Planet Blog - obit Simon Vinkenoog
 Simon Vinkenoog te gast bij Barend en van Dorp

20th-century Dutch poets
Dutch poets laureate
Dutch male poets
Spoken word poets
20th-century Dutch male writers
Writers from Amsterdam
1928 births
2009 deaths